The 2005 Arizona State Sun Devils baseball team represented Arizona State University in the 2005 NCAA Division I baseball season. The Sun Devils played their home games at Packard Stadium, and played as part of the Pacific-10 Conference. The team was coached by Pat Murphy in his eleventh season as head coach at Arizona State.

The Sun Devils reached the College World Series, their nineteenth appearance in Omaha, where they finished in third place after recording wins against , Nebraska and eventual runner-up Florida and losing to Nebraska and Florida.

Personnel

Roster

Coaches

Schedule and results

References

Arizona State Sun Devils baseball seasons
Arizona State Sun Devils
College World Series seasons
Arizona State Sun Devils baseball
Arizona State